Donath–Landsteiner hemolytic anemia (DLHA) is a result of cold-reacting antibody immunoglobulin (Ig) induced hemolytic response inside vessels leading to anemia and, thus, a cold antibody autoimmune hemolytic anemias (CAAHA).

In most patients with DLHA, the antibody selectively targets against the red blood cells on-surface antigen called the antigen P or antigen I, respectively. Most cases were found to be owing to polyclonal IgG. Nonetheless, IgM-induced DLHA has already also been described in the past. For example, there was a case study reporting that autoimmune hemolytic anemia where an IgA Donath–Landsteiner denoted as [D-L] antibody appeared to cause Donath–Landsteiner cold hemoglobinuria. The most notable difference between DLHA and CAD (cold agglutinin disease) is the causative agent. For cold agglutinin disease, the causative agent is constantly owing to a cold-active IgM antibody.

In 1865, it was widely accepted as a common sense that cold exposure may result in hemoglobinuria paroxysms. After decades of devoted researches, now the elucidation of the etiology and diagnostic methods of DLHA have been learned and developed.

Discovering the D–L antibody has empowered DLHA to be differentiated from other hemoglobinuria that something other than D-L is responsible for. As of 2019, it is concluded that the existence of the Donath–Landsteiner antibody is clearly pathognomonic for the DLHA.

Signs and symptoms

Somewhat similar to cold agglutinin disease, more than often, signs and symptoms of DHLA is tied to an abrupt onset of hemoglobinuria subsequent to  cold exposure.

Exact signs and symptoms of DLHA are anemia-alike
 dyspnea
 palpitations
 fatigue
 pallor
Hemolysis-alike
 jaundice
 dark urine
 pain

Signs and symptoms that indicate a medical emergency and that the patients with DLHA require to be hospitalized
 Rapidly progressive anemia
 Worsening anemia
 Severe anemia
 Respiratory distress
 Circulatory shock
 Renal failure
 Severe infection
 Patient's condition is unstable that produces the need to closely monitor.

Cause
DLHA can be either primary or secondary. Patients with emergent manifestation are likely deemed primary. The absolute causative agent is seldom identified.

Acute Donath–Landsteiner hemolytic anemia is linked to viral infections such as:
 Adenovirus
 Congenital syphilis
 Coxsackievirus A9
 Cytomegalovirus
 Epstein–Barr virus
 Influenza A
 Measles
 Mumps
 Parvovirus
 Varicella zoster virus

Pathogens of bacterial infections that are linked to acute DLHA
 Mycoplasma pneumoniae
 Haemophilus influenzae
 Klebsiella pneumoniae
 Escherichia coli

In addition to the commonly-seen causes mentioned above, oncologic reasons may also establish. DLHA has been rarely weighted in by non-Hodgkin lymphoma, as well as oat cell carcinoma.

Pathophysiology

The causative agent of DLHA is a cold-active immunoglobulin commonly denoted as the D–L autoantibody which demonstrates bi-phasic hemolysin capability of causing serious hemolysis even when the titer detection is low, which is because of its capacity to detach itself from the lysed RBCs and consequently bind intact erythrocytes according to the temperature changes.

D-L antibodies are most commonly targeted against P antigens than I antigens and others expressed on the RBC membrane.

After successful attachment to RBC surfaces, the D–L then activates the complement cascade, leading to RBC membrane perforation (i.e., intra-vascular hemolysis phenomenon).

Diagnosis

Hemoglobinuria is not necessary for diagnosis because hemoglobinuria is sometimes absent in the case. Additionally, a history of exposure to cold temperatures is not always attained. Given the fact that hemoglobinuria as well as a personal history of exposure to cold temperatures are not always present, the diagnosis heavily relies on laboratory testing.

The laboratory tests comprise complete blood count and peripheral blood smear. The laboratory test results will reveal evaluations like anisocytosis, nucleated red blood cells, poikilocytosis, polychromasia, spherocytosis, and erythrophagocytosis by neutrophils.

Blood typing is supposed to be performed with every patient even if their anemia is mild since the hemoglobin can fall all of a sudden and require prompt blood transfusion.

Anti-immunoglobulin G (anti-Ig) often disassociates itself from the surface of red blood cells under warm degrees of temperatures. Thus, the direct antiglobulin test for anti-immunoglobulin G (anti-Ig) often manifests a negative results. That's why it's important to note that the indirect antiglobulin test must be carried out in an environment at cold temperatures. Afterwards, the specimen goes incubated under  so that the later components of complement can then be enabled. The membrane attack complex leads the red blood cells to undergo lysis.

Blood chemistry, serology, urinalysis and suchlike may also be performed. For patients of DLHA who perform the serologic testing, summaries for syphilis, mycoplasmal infection, or viruses such as, adenovirus, cytomegalovirus, Epstein–Barr virus, influenza A, measles, mumps, and varicella might be shown positive. It's up to the underlying pathological conditions.

Management

Patients with DLHA should be instructed to avoid exposure to cold weather, particularly if the environment is extreme cold. The risk of hemolysis associated with strenuous exercise should be told to the patients.

Patients with DLHA whose anemia is neither mild nor stable and the renal function is not practically normal generally need medical attention and treatment for DLHA.

If the patient with DLHA is in medical emergency, health care providers including hematologist should take actions to preclude the patient from developing severe anemia and/or acute renal failure. At the meanwhile, renal function and hemoglobin of the patient should be closely watched until normalized and stable.

Prognosis

Most patients do not require medical intervention. Nevertheless, the rare chances of life-threatening acute drop in hemoglobin are always there and in which are deemed to develop hypovolemic shock and cardiac failure due to severe anemia, and to be complicated by acute tubular necrosis as a result of hemoglobinuria over the aftermath.

In addition to the rarely happened severe anemia and complications, prognosis of DLHA is deemed to be very good. Most patients recovered spontaneously not longer than 30 days since the disease onset.

Long-term mild hemolytic anemia has been reported for several children who were in the likelihood of recurrence on exposure to any kind of cold or with illness.

Case studies of those with recurrent DLHA suggest that repeated episodes of the hemolysis should not be regarded as false positive because the chances do truly exist when the patient has a D-L antibody to an antigen other than anti-P. Chronic syphilis-associated DLHA resolves when the underlying disease receives appropriate treatment.

Prevalence
Acute AIHA is uncommon. Acute DLHA occurs more in childhood than in adulthood. The D-L autoantibody is an ordinary cause of AIHA in children. It is predicted that 30–40% among all pediatric AIHA cases may have DLHA. Male-to-female ratio of the prevalence was shown as 2.1:1, meaning that DHLA is more often seen in males. No racial or ethnic difference on prevalence has been noted as of early 2019.

See also
 Anemia of prematurity
 Fanconi anemia

References

External links

Autoimmune diseases
Cold autoimmune hemolytic anemia
Acquired hemolytic anemia
Transfusion medicine